is a Japanese professional footballer who plays as a winger or striker for Scottish Premiership side Celtic and the Japan national team.

Club career

Matsumoto Yamaga 
In 2016, Maeda joined Matsumoto Yamaga FC. He got his J-League debut on 28 February 2016. It was on 28 August 2016, that he scored his first goal as a professional in an Emperor's Cup game against Tokuyama University.

After his loan spell at Mito, he struggled for regular playing time and was loaned to the Portuguese club, Maritimo in 2019. He left the club in 2021 after his loan with Yokohama F. Marinos was made permanent.

Mito HollyHock (loan) 
On 6 January 2017, Matsumoto Yamaga FC announced that Maeda will be joining Mito HollyHock on a loan deal that will run from February 2017 until January 2018. He ended the season while scoring 13 goals.

Maritimo (loan) 
On 11 August 2019, he made his debut in the opening round of Portuguese League against Sporting CP when he came on as a substitute in the 57th minute.

On 25 August 2019, Maeda scored his debut goal in a 3–2 loss to CD Tondela.

Yokohama F. Marinos 

On 3 August 2020, a loan transfer to Yokohama F. Marinos was announced. He scored his first goal after the transfer in the match against Shimizu S-Pulse on 19 August, and contributed to the team's first victory in three games.

By the end of the season, it was announced that the deal would be made permanent. On 7 March 2021, he scored a brace against Sanfrecce Hiroshima and continued his prolific run of form on 17 March, scoring four goals in one game against Tokushima Vortis. On 25 September 2021, with a goal against Yokohama FC, Maeda became the top scorer in the J1 League. On 6 November against FC Tokyo, he scored his second hat-trick of the season to keep his spot in the top scorers' ranking. In addition to being named in the J.League Best XI at the end of the season, Maeda was also co-J.League Top Scorer with Leandro Damiao of Kawasaki Frontale, who had equalled his total of 23 goals for the campaign.

Celtic
On 31 December 2021, Maeda was announced to have signed for Scottish Premiership club Celtic on loan for the rest of the season, with an obligation to buy at the end of the loan. On 17 January 2022, Maeda made his debut and scored his first goal in the 4th minute, in a league fixture against Hibernian at Celtic Park. Maeda signed a four-year contract with Celtic at the end of the season, when his move was made permanent.

On 6 September 2022, Maeda came on as a half-time substitute for Liel Abada to make his UEFA Champions League debut in a 3-0 home defeat against Real Madrid. On 2 January 2023, he scored the opening goal in a 2-2 draw at Rangers. His form at this time seen Premier League side Southampton monitor Maeda.

International career
On 24 May 2019, Maeda was called by Japan's head coach Hajime Moriyasu to feature in the Copa América played in Brazil. He was also the first Matsumoto Yamaga player to ever feature for the senior's side. He made his debut on 17 June 2019 in the game against Chile, as a starter. 

In Japan's 2022 World Cup game against Germany, Maeda was placed as starting striker. He was substituted in the 57th minute by Takuma Asano. Japan advanced out of the group stage after beating Spain 2–1. On 5 December 2022, Maeda scored a goal at the 43rd minute to put Japan in front during the round of 16 game against Croatia which eventually ended 1–1 with Japan crashing out after their defeat on penalties.

Style of play 
Though primarily and initially used by both Matsumoto Yamaga and Yokohama F. Marinos as a left winger, Maeda is able to operate in a number of positions as a forward, including on the opposite flank, as an attacking midfielder or occasionally a second striker. Regarding his stamina and conditioning, former coach John Hutchinson referred to Maeda as a "machine", while Arthur Papas, who also coached Maeda during his time at Yokohama, has said Maeda "possesses athletic qualities far superior to most players at the professional level", hailing his pace and sprinting.

Career statistics

Club

International

Scores and results list Japan's goal tally first.

Honours

Celtic
Scottish Premiership: 2021–22
Scottish League Cup: 2022–23

Individual
J.League Top Scorer: 2021
J.League Best XI: 2021

References

External links
Profile at Matsumoto Yamaga 
Profile at Mito HollyHock 

1997 births
Living people
Association football people from Osaka Prefecture
Japanese footballers
Association football forwards
Japan international footballers
J1 League players
J2 League players
Primeira Liga players
Matsumoto Yamaga FC players
Mito HollyHock players
C.S. Marítimo players
Yokohama F. Marinos players
Celtic F.C. players
Footballers at the 2018 Asian Games
Asian Games silver medalists for Japan
Asian Games medalists in football
Medalists at the 2018 Asian Games
2019 Copa América players
2022 FIFA World Cup players
Footballers at the 2020 Summer Olympics
Olympic footballers of Japan
Japanese expatriate footballers
Japanese expatriate sportspeople in Portugal
Expatriate footballers in Portugal
Japanese expatriate sportspeople in Scotland
Expatriate footballers in Scotland